Leptopelis is a genus of frogs in the family Arthroleptidae. They are found throughout Sub-Saharan Africa, excluding Madagascar. It is placed in monotypic subfamily Leptopelinae, although this subfamily is not always recognized. They have a number of common names, including forest treefrogs, tree frogs, leaf-frogs, and big-eyed frogs.

Description
Leptopelis are mostly medium-sized frogs (snout–vent length ), but Leptopelis palmatus can reach . Tympanum is present. Most species have expended digit tips.

Ecology
Leptopelis are mainly arboreal, but some species, especially in more arid areas, are terrestrial or even subfossorial. Breeding typically starts with the heavy rains in the beginning of the wet season. Eggs may be deposited either in water or in/on the ground. Development includes a free-living tadpole stage, with a possible exception of Leptopelis brevirostris, whose large eggs suggest that development could be direct. Males typically call in bushes or trees a meter or more above the ground.

Species 
As of July 2021, there are 54 recognized species:

In captivity 
L. vermiculatus is found in international pet trade. They are hardy frogs that adapt well to captivity, and readily consume commercially available crickets.

References

 
Arthroleptidae
Amphibian genera
Amphibians of Sub-Saharan Africa
Taxa named by Albert Günther